Ludwig van Beethoven composed his Natural Horn Sonata in F major, Op. 17 in 1800 for the virtuoso horn player Giovanni Punto.  It was premiered with Punto as the soloist, accompanied on the piano by Beethoven himself in Vienna on April 18, 1800.

Beethoven was not well known outside of Vienna at the time of this composition, and after a performance of the piece in Pest, played by Punto and Beethoven, a Hungarian critic wrote, "Who is this Beethover (sic)? His name is not known to us. Of course, Punto is very well known."

Instrumentation

This work was written for the natural horn and in the cor basse idiom, i.e. Beethoven incorporates rapid arpeggios in the first and third movement as well as use of the factitious low G below the second harmonic. These were all traits of cor basse playing, the genre in which Punto specialised.

However, like many works of this period, to broaden the potential market for the work, an arrangement of the sonata for cello was made, probably by Beethoven, for publication. It was then published as "Sonate pour le Forte-Piano avec un Cor ou Violoncelle." Versions for violin, flute were also made.

A further arrangement for string quintet was made by oboist Carl Khym for the music publisher Simrock in 1817.

Structure

It consists of three movements:

 Allegro moderato
 Poco adagio, quasi andante
 Rondo - Allegro moderato

A standard performance of this 3-movement work usually lasts 15–16 minutes.

References
Notes

Sources

Further reading

External links 
 
 
 

Sonatas by Ludwig van Beethoven
Beethoven
1800 compositions
Compositions in F major